Robert Ciba (born 29 November 1969) is a Polish boxer. He competed in the men's bantamweight event at the 1992 Summer Olympics.

References

External links
 

1969 births
Living people
Polish male boxers
Olympic boxers of Poland
Boxers at the 1992 Summer Olympics
People from Kielce County
Sportspeople from Świętokrzyskie Voivodeship
AIBA World Boxing Championships medalists
Bantamweight boxers
20th-century Polish people
21st-century Polish people